The New Norfolk District Football Club, nicknamed The Eagles, is an Australian rules football club currently playing in the Southern Football League, in Tasmania, Australia.

History

Origins

The club was founded in 1878 with the first premiership won in 1891 under the name "Derwent Football Club", which would last until the late 1890s. With the "New Norfolk" name the team won the Southern Country Championship in 1904, the Brown Trophy (1906), the Ellis Dean (1908–1909) and the Corumbene Trophy (1910, 1913).

World War I ceased the club activity. In 1920 New Norfolk defeated Molesworth to win the Derwent Valley Football Association Premiership. Then came the Cyril Nash Trophy in which New Norfolk defeated Scottsdale by three points at York Park in 1921 and Clarence in 1922.  The club’s next three premierships came in the Southern Tasmanian Country Football Association in 1928, 1930 and 1933, which would be the last year in the SCFA.

In 1934 New Norfolk played at Southern District Football Association, where it lasted until 1946 (excluding the World War II years). The following year the club entered to TANFL/TFL, where it played until 1999, joining the Southern Football League in 2000.

TANFL and District Football 
In 1944 TANFL directors met to discuss restructuring of the league which was scheduled to return in 1945 after three seasons in recession due to World War Two. The clubs would represent their various districts rather than being individual clubs. 
Two new clubs (Hobart & Sandy Bay) would join at the expense of Cananore and Lefroy which went out of existence during the World War Two cessation.

In 1947 the TANFL voted to include a further two clubs (Clarence – formed in 1903 and New Norfolk – formed in 1878) from the Southern District Football Association for a three-year probationary period, on 7 August 1950, the clubs unanimously voted to retain the two clubs as permanent members of the competition.

In early 1986 the TANFL went into liquidation and a newly constituted Tasmanian Football League replaced it as the sport's governing body.

The TFL initiated the new competition as the TFL Statewide League with all six former TANFL clubs involved, North Launceston and East Launceston also joined the competition from the NTFA in early 1986.

However, the new-look competition did not garner the support of the football public at either end of the state at first, with the lowest attendance recorded was 470 at KGV Football Park when New Norfolk hosted South Launceston on 28 June.

In 1987 the Devonport Football Club joined the competition under a new Blues emblem, along with Burnie Hawks (formerly the Cooee Bulldogs), which created a ten-club competition with all three regions now represented. All clubs were required to field teams in seniors, reserves and under-19s competition from that season.

At first the competition appeared well balanced with three different clubs – Glenorchy, North Hobart and Devonport – winning the league's first three premierships and, importantly, the strong level of competition produced a very high standard of football.

Of even greater importance, the league began to be well supported by players, clubs, sponsors, the general public and the media – which had for many years been unenthusiastic about Tasmanian football – was now giving the TFL Statewide League its full support.

The TFL administration had also been lax in their financial control of the competition and by 1992 it was servicing a debt of $300,000 and growing as crowd numbers continued to plummet.

By 1997 the league appeared to be in deep trouble, the level of interest in the TFL had continued to drop as crowds continued to stay away in droves as the competition had evolved into a two-horse race. The preceding five premierships had been won by just two clubs – Clarence and North Launceston.

Faced with enormous debts and dismal attendances, four clubs were to quit the TFL at the end of the 1997 season. 
By 1998, the TFL was on the brink of collapse. In a leaked document to the Hobart Mercury newspaper, the following was an official list of club debts at the completion of the 1998 TFL Statewide League season: Burnie Dockers ($735,819), Devonport ($709,067), New Norfolk ($431,858), Glenorchy ($267,897), North Hobart ($232,607), Northern Bombers ($167,570), Clarence ($153,441), Southern Districts ($80,000). With the debt level continuing to rise, New Norfolk left the League and sort permission to join the Southern Football League.

When AFL Tasmania decided to commit to a statewide league for the 2009 season former TFL club New Norfolk (1947–1998) was not invited to join the league because of their poor financial position. New Norfolk have dominated in the Southern Football League, playing in eleven Grand Finals and winning seven of them.

Honours

Premiership Titles
Entered STFL/Premier League/SFL 
2000

SFL Premierships 
2005, 2009, 2010, 2012, 2013, 2014, 2017

SFL Runner Up 
2000, 2004, 2011, 2015

TFL Premierships 
1906, 1968, 1982

TFL Runner Up 
1959, 1964, 1970, 1972, 1981, 1983, 1994

Tasmanian State Premierships 
1968

Southern District FA Premierships 
1939, 1945

Southern District FA Runner Up 
1934

Southern Country FA Premierships 
1928, 1930, 1933

Southern Country FA Runner Up 
1927, 1931, 1932

Derwent Valley FA Premierships 
1920

Southern Country Championship Winners 
1904, 1906, 1908, 1909, 1910, 1913

Notes

Record Home Attendance
7,981 v Clarence on 14 June 1965 at North Hobart Oval 
4,710 v Clarence on 25 April 1964 at Boyer Oval 
An unofficial crowd just short of 5,000 was reported to have attended a home match against Huonville at Boyer Oval on 16 June 2012 in the Southern Football League.

Record Finals Attendance
24,413 v Clarence on 12 September 1970 at North Hobart Oval

Club Record Score
(SFL) 40.36 (276) v Triabunna 4.5 (29) on 5 June 2010 at Triabunna Recreation Ground.  
(TFL) 39.17 (251) v Clarence 11.12 (78) on 30 July 1983 at Boyer Oval

Individual Honours

All-Australian Team Selection 
1966 – Peter Hudson

William Leitch Medal winners
(Best & Fairest player in TFL and SFL Seniors) 
1948 – Jim Brown 
1952 – Cliff Busch 
1954 – Bruce Roe 
1955 – Rex Garwood 
1958 – Rex Garwood 
1961 – Roger Browning 
1962 – Roger Browning 
1972 – Ricky Graham 
1974 – Tony Browning 
1981 – Robbie Dykes 
1985 – Graham Hunnibell 
1990 – Ricky Hanlon 
1993 – Rene Peters 
2002 – Matthew Jones (Awarded Retrospectively) 
2004 – Brock Ackerley & Roger Belcher (tied) 
2007 – Brad Carver 
2009 – Roger Belcher 
2011 – Nathan Ross 
2012 – Michael Thompson 
2013 – Nathan Ross 
2014 – Caden Wilson

Darrel Baldock Medal winners
(Best player in TFL Statewide League Grand Final) 
1994 – Jason Wilton

Gorringe-Martyn Medal winners
(Best Player in SFL Grand Final) 
2005 – Michael Thompson 
2009 – Sam Hall 
2010 – Matthew Smith 
2012 – Brad Carver 
2013 – Nathan Ross 
2014 – Nathan Ross 
2017 – Jason Laycock

Lefroy Medal winners
(Best Player in Interstate Matches) 
1965 – Peter Hudson 
1982 – Graham Hunnibell 
1983 – Michael Hunnibell 
1984 – Wayne Fox 
1985 – Wayne Fox

Weller Arnold Medal winners
1966 – Barry Browning 
1970 – Ricky Graham

George Watt Medal winners
(Best & Fairest Player – TFL Reserves) 
1953 – T. Maddox 
1964 – Ken Latham 
1965 – Ken Latham 
1967 – Robert Wilton 
1970 – L. Barratt 
1973 – G. Richardson 
1974 – R. Wylie 
1979 – N. Bester 
1983 – Steven Sutton 
1986 – Robbie Crane 
1991 – Brendan Skelly 
1992 – Justin Rainbird 
1993 – Adrian Jeffries

Major V.A Geard Medal winners
(Best & Fairest Player – TFL Thirds) 
1963 - Graeme Glover. 
1964 - Harold Wilton. 
1966 - Tony Browning. 
1967 - Gary Barnes. 
1970 - Kerry Edwards. 
1971 - Tim Woodham. 
1976 – Steven Sutton. 
1977 – Dan Munnings. 
1986 – Jason Taylor. 
1988 – Steven Byers. 
1995 – Rikki Braslin.

(Best and Fairest - SFL Colts) 
2002 - Ashley Rhodes. 
2003 - Adam Whitford. 
2006 - Brett Booth. 
2014 - Jake Foster.

Doug Plaister Medal winners
(Best & Fairest Player – TFL Fourths) 
1975 – Paul Jarvis 
1980 – Leigh Brooks 
1981 – Mark Hall 
1982 – Mark Hall 
1983 – Michael Eiszele 
1984 – Jason Taylor 
1988 – Paul Banks-Smith 
1989 – Paul Barrow 
1991 – John Cooley 
1993 – Ricky Braslin 
1994 – Damien Triffitt 
1995 – Craig Haremza & Damien Triffitt

TFL Leading Goalkickers
1963 – Peter Hudson (79) 
1964 – Peter Hudson (86) 
1965 – Peter Hudson (110) 
1966 – Peter Hudson (103) 
1983 – Wayne Fox (135) 
1984 – Wayne Fox (93) 
1985 – Wayne Fox (130) 
1987 – Paul Dac (80) 
1990 – Paul Dac (103) 
1991 – Paul Dac (133)

SFL Leading Goalkickers
2003 – Matthew Smith (67) 
2005 – Sean Salter (72) 
2009 – Adrian Burdon (106) 
2012 – Michael Thompson (101) 
2014 – Josh Hall (112)

Club Record Games Holder 
Luke Joseph (383 total games) 
Michael Eiszele (340 total games)

Club Record Senior Games 
Roger Belcher (301) 
Chris Sproule (264) 
Hedley Thompson (254)

Club Record Reserves Games 
Josh Kelly (218)
Dean King (180)

Club Record Goalkicking (Single Match)
18.6 – Brendan Fevola v Huonville Lions on 16 June 2012 at Boyer Oval

References

External links

Official Facebook site
AFL Southern Tasmania

Australian rules football clubs in Tasmania
1878 establishments in Australia
Australian rules football clubs established in 1878
Tasmanian Football League clubs